Francis Charles Philips (3 February 1849 – 21 April 1921) was a British army officer, actor, theatre-manager, dramatist, barrister, journalist, short story writer and novelist. He wrote over forty novels and over a dozen plays.

Biography
He was born at Brighton, the younger son of the Rev. George Washington Philips (1784–1865), a slave owner on St Kitts. He was educated at Brighton College.

After a course at Sandhurst, Philips became a British army officer, gazetted to the 2nd Queen's Royals shortly before his nineteenth birthday. He served for three years, mainly in Ireland and at Aldershot. After resigning his military commission, he became an actor, first in Liverpool and then in London. In 1880 he began the study of law and was called to the bar in 1884 at the Middle Temple.

Due to his friendship with Čedomilj Mijatović, Philips was made Knight Commander of the Order of St. Sava.

Works
In 1886 for a paper called Life, Philips wrote a weekly serial entitled Le Journal d'une Mondaine. After the completion of the serial, he tried to have it published in book form. After rejection by five publishing companies, Philips, on the advice of his friend Edward Morton, submitted the work to Ward & Downey. The novel was then published in two volumes under the title As in a Looking Glass. The initial printing sold out in the first three weeks. The novel was then printed in a single volume at a price of six shillings, selling nearly 40,000 copies. Published in various editions, it was sold in nearly every country in Europe. Philips continued writing popular novels; his three other most successful novels were Jack and Three Jills, The Strange Adventures of Lucy Smith, and Mrs. Bouverie. He published in total 30 fiction titles.

In April 1889 Sarah Bernhardt was a success in the role of "Lena Despard", the main character in a French stage adaptation of the novel As in a Looking Glass.

Philips wrote many plays. He co-authored the play The Free Pardon with Leonard Merrick. He collaborated with Seymour Hicks on the play Papa's Wife, an adaptation of Philips's story In the Third Capacity.

Family
Philips was twice a widower. By his first wife Maria he had a son. By his second wife Eva Maude Mary Kevill-Davies he a son and two daughters.

See also 
 As in a Looking Glass

References

External links
 
 

1849 births
1921 deaths
19th-century English novelists
Graduates of the Royal Military College, Sandhurst
People educated at Brighton College
Queen's Royal Regiment officers
English male novelists
19th-century English male writers